Snider Hall is a historic building on the campus of Southern Methodist University in University Park, Texas, U.S.. It was built in 1927, and designed by Wyatt C. Hedrick in the Georgian Revival architectural style. It has been listed on the National Register of Historic Places since September 27, 1980.

It has three-part Palladian-type facades.

See also

National Register of Historic Places listings in Dallas County, Texas

References

External links

National Register of Historic Places in Dallas County, Texas
Georgian Revival architecture in Texas
University and college buildings completed in 1927
Southern Methodist University
1927 establishments in Texas